In colloidal and surface chemistry, the critical micelle concentration (CMC) is defined as the concentration of surfactants above which micelles form and all additional surfactants added to the system will form micelles.

The CMC is an important characteristic of a surfactant. Before reaching the CMC, the surface tension changes strongly with the concentration of the surfactant. After reaching the CMC, the surface tension remains relatively constant or changes with a lower slope. The value of the CMC for a given dispersant in a given medium depends on temperature, pressure, and (sometimes strongly) on the presence and concentration of other surface active substances and electrolytes. Micelles only form above critical micelle temperature.

For example, the value of CMC for sodium dodecyl sulfate in water (without other additives or salts) at 25 °C, atmospheric pressure, is 8x10−3 mol/L.

Description 

Upon introducing surfactants (or any surface active materials) into a system, they will initially partition into the interface, reducing the system free energy by:
 lowering the energy of the interface (calculated as area times surface tension), and
 removing the hydrophobic parts of the surfactant from contact with water.

Subsequently, when the surface coverage by the surfactants increases, the surface free energy (surface tension) decreases and the surfactants start aggregating into micelles, thus again decreasing the system's free energy by decreasing the contact area of hydrophobic parts of the surfactant with water. Upon reaching CMC, any further addition of surfactants will just increase the number of micelles (in the ideal case).

According to one well-known definition, CMC is the total concentration of surfactants under the conditions:
if C = CMC, (d3/dCt3) = 0
 = A[Cs] + B[Cm]; i.e., in words Cs = [single surfactant ion] , Cm = [micelles] and A and B are proportionality constants
Ct = Cs + NCm; i.e., N =  represents the number of detergent ions per micelle

Measurement
The CMC generally depends on the method of measuring the samples, since A and B depend on the properties of the solution such as conductance, photochemical characteristics or surface tension.  When the degree of aggregation is monodisperse, then the CMC is not related to the method of measurement. On the other hand, when the degree of aggregation is polydisperse, then CMC is related to both the method of measurement and the dispersion.

The common procedure to determine the CMC from experimental data is to look for the intersection (inflection point) of two straight lines traced through plots of the measured property versus the surfactant concentration. This visual data analysis method is highly subjective and can lead to very different CMC values depending on the type of representation, the quality of the data and the chosen interval around the CMC. A preferred method is the fit of the experimental data with a model of the measured property. Fit functions for properties such as electrical conductivity, surface tension, NMR chemical shifts, absorption, self-diffusion coefficients, fluorescence intensity and mean translational diffusion coefficient of fluorescent dyes in surfactant solutions have been presented. These fit functions are based on a model for the concentrations of monomeric and micellised surfactants in solution, which establishes a well-defined analytical definition of the CMC, independent from the technique.

The CMC is the concentration of surfactants in the bulk at which micelles start forming. The word bulk is important because surfactants partition between the bulk and interface and CMC is independent of interface and is therefore a characteristic of the surfactant molecule.  In most situations, such as surface tension measurements or conductivity measurements, the amount of surfactant at the interface is negligible compared to that in the bulk and CMC can be approximated by the total concentration. In practice, CMC data is usually collected using laboratory instruments which allow the process to be partially automated, for instance by using specialised tensiometers.

Practical considerations
When the interfacial areas are large, the amount of surfactant at the interface cannot be neglected. If, for example, air bubbles are introduced into a solution of a surfactant above CMC, these bubbles, as they rise to the surface, remove surfactants from the bulk to the top of the solution creating a foam column and thus reducing the concentration in bulk to below CMC. This is one of the easiest methods to remove surfactants from effluents (see foam flotation). Thus in foams with sufficient interfacial area are devoid of micelles. Similar reasoning holds for emulsions.

The other situation arises in detergents. One initially starts off with concentrations greater than CMC in water and on adding fabric with large interfacial area, the surfactant concentration drops below CMC and no micelles remain at equilibrium. Therefore, the solubilization plays a minor role in detergents. Removal of oily soil occurs by modification of the contact angles and release of oil in the form of emulsion.

In petroleum industry, CMC is considered prior to injecting surfactant in reservoir regarding enhanced oil recovery (EOR) application. Below the CMC point, interfacial tension between oil and water phase is no longer effectively reduced. If the concentration of the surfactant is kept a little above the CMC, the additional amount covers the dissolution with existing brine in the reservoir. It is desired that the surfactant will work at the lowest interfacial tension (IFT).

See also 
Detergent
Surface tension
Surfactant
Micelles

References

External links 
Theory of CMC measurement
 CMCs and molecular weights of several detergents on OpenWetWare

Colloidal chemistry